Benni Korzen (born April 1, 1938) is an Oscar-winning Danish producer, best known for producing Babette's Feast (1987).

Born in Copenhagen, Denmark, Korzen won the Best Foreign Film Oscar for Babette's Feast in 1988. The producer also won the BAFTA Best Foreign Film award for Babette's Feast, the same year. Since moving to The United States from his native Denmark, Benni has produced, line-produced or executive produced over 20 feature films on budgets ranging from under $1 million to over $15 million solely or in partnership with Just Betzer or New York City producers Rankin and Bass. In addition, Benni is the co-owner of Panorama Film International, New York City and has served as the General Partner in two limited partnerships that produced 6 feature films distributed by New Line Cinema. Currently, Benni is developing two Off-Broadway hits into films, Forever Plaid, the musical written by Stuart Ross, and Beau Jest, the stage play written by James A. Sherman.

He is married to actress Annie Korzen and has one child, Jonathan, who is a graduate of Bard College, and is currently working in Internet publishing.

Filmography 
 THE BUSHIDO BLADE (1981)

References

Danish film producers
Living people
1938 births